Pia Maria of Orléans-Braganza (4 March 191324 October 2000) was member of the former House of Orléans-Braganza and the former Brazilian Imperial Family.

Life

With the premature death of her father, Prince Luís of Orléans-Braganza, in 1920, and the following year, the death of her grandmother, Isabel, Princess Imperial of Brazil, in 1921, Pia Maria's older brother Prince Pedro Henrique of Orléans-Braganza claimed the title Prince Imperial of Brazil in 1920, and the position of head of the Imperial House of Brazil in 1921. At the time of the latter claim, Prince Pedro Henrique still had no children, so Prince Luiz Gastão of Orléans-Braganza, brother of Pedro Henrique and Pia Maria, claimed the title of Prince Imperial. Prince Luiz Gastão died early ten years later, at the age of twenty, in 1931, giving Pia Maria, for the brief period of seven years, a claim to be Princess Imperial of Brazil and the second in the line of succession to the former Brazilian throne.

This situation changed in 1938, when the first-born of Pedro Henrique, Prince Luiz of Orléans-Braganza was born. Pia Maria returned to using an earlier title of Princess of Brazil, the third in line of succession, a situation that she would retain even through unequal marriage, with the Count of Nicolay. The "provisional" situation of Princess Imperial to which Pia Maria was subjected is similar to that of her great-great-aunt Princess Januária of Brazil, who was the Princess Imperial from 1835 to 1845, when the firstborn of the Emperor Pedro II was born.

She died at the Chateau de Le Lude on 24 October 2000.

Marriage and issue
She married in Paris, on 12 August 1948, René Jean Marie Nicholas de Nicolaÿ, Count of Nicolaÿ (1910-1954), son of Aymard Marie Jean de Nicolaÿ, Marquis of Goussainville, and his wife, Yvonne Léonie Marie Anne Georgine de Talhouët-Roy. They had two children:

Louis-Jean de Nicolaÿ, Marquis de Goussainville (born Louis-Jean de Nicolaÿ, Le Mans, France, 18 September 1949). He is senator by Sarthe, department of France. He married in Luxembourg on 23 August 1980 Countess Barbara Marie Anne d'Ursel de Bousies, daughter of Count Michel Alfred Isabelle Marie d'Ursel de Bousies and Ferdinanda dei Marchesi Diana. They had two sons and two daughters:
 Marie-Adélaïde Jeanne Paule Bénédicte Stéphanie de Nicolaÿ (b. 1982)
 Marguerite Marie Philippine Roberte Jeanne Paola de Nicolaÿ (b. 1984)
 Antoine Marie Philippe René Michel Joseph de Nicolaÿ (b. 1988)
 Arnaud de Nicolaÿ (b. 1991)

Robert Maria Pio Benoit de Nicolaÿ (born Robert Marie Pie Benoit de Nicolay, Neuilly-sur-Seine, France, February 17, 1952). He held various positions in the government of France, having become Minister of State. He married in Paris on 5 February 1983 Nathalie Laetitia Jeanne Yvonne Marie, Princess of Murat, daughter of Prince Napoléon Joachim Louis Maurice Murat (son of Prince Alexandre Murat and grandson of Joachim, 5th Prince Murat) and Inès d'Albert de Luynes (daughter of Philippe d'Albert, 11th duc de Luynes). They had two sons and three daughters:
 Irène Marie Pia Inès de Nicolaÿ (1985-2007)
 Louise Marie Jeanne Yvonne de Nicolaÿ (b. 1987)
 Elvire Marie Pauline Laure de Nicolaÿ (b. 1988)
 René de Nicolaÿ (b. 1991)
 Christian de Nicolaÿ (b. 2002)

Pia Maria preserved for herself the title of Princess of Brazil, even though she contracted an unequal union.

Ancestry

Notes and sources
Imperial House of Brazil (Portuguese)
The Royal House of Stuart, London, 1969, 1971, 1976, Addington, A. C., Reference: page 50.

|-

1913 births
2000 deaths
People from Cannes
Pia Maria